SMK Mambau (formerly SM Mambau) is a high school or secondary school which was opened in 1990.  The school is located in the districts of Seremban and Port Dickson in Negeri Sembilan, Malaysia.

History
Sekolah Menengah Kebangsaaan Mambau (SMK Mambau) was opened in December 1989. The school was built within a  compound with a budget of RM 2.1 million. SMK Mambau started as a B-grade school with only 163 students enrolled.

Background
SMK Mambau is situated within a district of Port Dickson and Seremban. Most students of SMK Mambau are local residents of Kampung Baru Mambau, Kampung Batu Tiga, Kampung Mantau, Taman Angsamas, Taman Kelab Tunku, Taman Seri Mambau Kampung (village) Bemban and Bandar Baru Spring Hills. By 2001 SMK Mambau comprised five building blocks, science labs and a workshop on Living Skills.

The school was crowned as first runner up of The Nation's Most Promising Schools (Anugerah Sekolah Harapan Negara),held in conjunction of Teacher's Day on 16 May 2007 at Persada Johor, Johor Bahru.

Notable alumni
 Ahmad Nabil Ahmad - actor, winner of the second season of Raja Lawak Astro

External links
 SMK Mambau.net
 Friendster group
 Facebook group
 SMKM news

Schools in Negeri Sembilan
Secondary schools in Malaysia